The following is a list of Croatian exonyms, that is to say names for towns and cities that do not speak Croatian that have been adapted to Croatian spelling rules, or are simply native names from ancient times.

See also

List of European exonyms

Exonyms
Exonyms
Lists of exonyms